Paulina García Alfonso (born 27 November 1960), better known as Pali García, is a Chilean  actress, stage director, and playwright.

García debuted on television with a small role in the telenovela Los títeres (1984), but she was soon known for her theatre direction and for her various performances in films such as Tres noches de un sábado (2002), Cachimba (2004), Casa de remolienda (2007) and Gloria (2013).

García has received four nominations for the Altazor Awards, winning on one occasion, and three for the APES Awards — the Chilean Arts and Entertainment Critics Awards—winning twice. In February 2013 she won the prestigious Silver Bear for Best Actress at the Berlin International Film Festival for her performance in the movie Gloria, directed by Sebastián Lelio. In 2016, she appeared in Ira Sachs' film, Little Men.

Biography
Born in Santiago, García studied acting at the Pontifical Catholic University of Chile, where she graduated with a degree in theatre arts and later with diplomas in theatre direction and writing.

García made her debut at Catholic University's theatre in 1983 in ¿Dónde estará la Jeanette? ("Where could Jeanette be?") by Luis Rivano, a work for which she received an APES Award for best actress. Since then, she has acted in over thirty productions including Cariño malo, by Inés Margarita Stranger, El tío Vania, by Chekhov, The Trojan Women, by Euripides, El lugar común, Las analfabetas and BBB-Up.

The year following her theatre debut, García appeared on television as Adriana Godán in the TV series Los títeres, a role she shared with actress Gloria Münchmeyer.

The first work she directed was El continente negro ("The Dark Continent") by Marco Antonio de la Parra for which she received an APES Award nomination for best director in 1996. A grant from the National Arts Development Fund (Fondo Nacional de Desarrollo Cultural de las Artes, FONDART) allowed for the financing of productions such as Lucrecia y Judith by the same author, and Look Back in Anger by John Osborne. She has also directed at national theatre festivals on three occasions, directing works by authors such as Alberto Fuguet and Celeste Gómez.

García has taught acting at the theatre school of the University of Chile, at Fernando González night school, at the University for the Arts, Sciences, and Communication and the University for Development. Between 1997 and 2001, she founded and formed a part of the Theatre Directors Association (Asociación de Directores de Teatro, ADT).

In television, of note is her performance in Cárcel de Mujeres ("Women's Prison") as Raquel, a role for which García received both an APES Award and the Altazor Award for best actress.

In 2002, García received an Andes Foundation grant to undertake research on conjugal violence, Golpes extraños al amor ("Blows outside love"), which led to the work Peso negro ("Dark weight"), selected for the Unipersonales de Galpón 7 Festival, and Frágil ("Fragile"), a work presented at Matucana 100 Cultural Center under her direction.

In film, García debuted in the 2002 movie Tres noches de un sábado ("Three nights of one Saturday") by Joaquín Eyzaguirre, receiving a nomination for the Altazor Awards for her interpretation of the character Mathilde. She also appeared in the 2004 film Cachimba ("Hookah") by Silvio Caiozzi, in Casa de remolienda ("Party house") by Eyzaguirre in 2007, and in Gloria, by Sebastián Lelio, for which she received the Silver Bear for Best Actress at the Berlin International Film Festival.

Filmography

Films

Television

Theatre

Actress 
 ¿Dónde estará la Jeanette?, comedy by Luis Rivano
 Cariño malo, by Inés Stranger; dir.: Claudia Echenique; 1990; 2012
 Malasangre, dir.: Mauricio Celedón, 1991
 El tío Vania, by Anton Chekhov; dir.: Raúl Osorio, 1994
 El lugar común
 Inocencia, by Dea Loher; dir.: Luis Ureta; Muestra de Dramaturgia Europea, 2004
 En la Sangre, by Suzan-Lori Parks; dir.: Carlos Osorio; interprets Hester, a beggar; Centro Cultural Matucana 100, 2004
 Déjala sangrar, by Benjamín Galemiri, dir.: Adel Hakim; interprets Virna Vigo; 2005
 El último fuego, by Dea Loer; dir.: Luis Ureta; April 2009
 Gertrudis, el grito, by Howard Barker, dir.: Marcos Guzmán; 9th Festival of Contemporary European Theatre in Santiago, August 2009
 Las analfabetas, by Pablo Paredes, 2010
 Fábula del niño y los animales que se mueren, free version of Euripides The Trojan Women by Pablo Paredes; dir.: Isidora Stevenson; García interprets queen Hecuba; La Nacional company in Matucana 100, 6–15 January 2012

Director 
 El continente negro, by Marco Antonio de la Parra; 1996
 Lucrecia y Judith, by Marco Antonio de la Parra
 Recordando con ira, by John Osborne (Look Back in Anger in English)
 Anhelo del corazón, by Caryl Churchill ("A Heart's Desire"); Muestra de Dramaturgia Europea, 2004
 El neoproceso, work by Benjamín Galemiri inspired by Kafka, premiere: 15 July 2006
 La gran noche, by Marcelo Simonetti; premiere: 28 May 2008, Centro Mori in Vitacura
 Apoteosis final: BBB up, Santiago a Mil, January 2009
 Orates, by Jaime Lorca; premiere: 4 November 2010
 La mantis religiosa, by Alejandro Sieveking, La Palomera theatre, premiere: 9 June 2011
 Cerca de Moscú, adaptation by Pablo Paredes of two pieces by Chekhov: Platonov and Ivanov; Santiago a Mil International Festival 2013

Playwright
 Peso negro
 Frágil, 2002; premiered and directed by García in 2003.

Awards and nominations

APES Award

Altazor Awards

Silver Bear for Best Actress

Platino Awards

Festival de Cinema de Gramado - Brazil

References

1960 births
Living people
Actresses from Santiago
Chilean film actresses
Chilean stage actresses
Chilean telenovela actresses
Chilean television actresses
Chilean women dramatists and playwrights
Chilean theatre directors
Silver Bear for Best Actress winners
21st-century Chilean dramatists and playwrights